hockey for all centre is an ice hockey facility located in Winnipeg, Manitoba, Canada.  The  building is owned and operated by True North Sports and Entertainment (TNSE), which also owns Canada Life Centre in downtown Winnipeg.  The Winnipeg Jets of the National Hockey League and Manitoba Moose of the American Hockey League use the hockey for all centre as their practice and training facility.

Construction
hockey for all centre, originally known as the True North MoosePlex Hockey Canada Centre, was built on time and within its budget, at a cost of $26.6 million Canadian.  The federal and provincial governments contributed $11.7 million, while TNSE provided the remaining $14.9 million.  In exchange for public funding, TNSE guaranteed use of the facility for local amateur and recreational hockey.

In April 2010, as an extension of its naming rights relationship with Manitoba Telecom Services (MTS) for the MTS Centre, the facility was renamed MTS Iceplex.

A 21,000 square foot addition to the center was completed in 2016.  As part of this expansion, new training facilities and office space were built for the Jets and Moose.

The facility was renamed Bell MTS Iceplex following Bell Canada's acquisition of MTS in 2017. On November 14, 2022, TNSE announced a new partnership with Scotiabank to become the title sponsor of the facility, with the building rebranded as hockey for all centre, the name based on Scotiabank's hockey for all initiative.

Facilities
hockey for all centre is located on the western edge of the city, near the junction of Portage Avenue and the west Perimeter Highway.  It is surrounded by the Perimeter Highway to the east, Assiniboia Downs to the north, Pointe West AutoPark to the south, and the Red River Exhibition grounds to the WEST.  The facility is open year-round and consists of four arenas, dryland training facilities, 22 dressing rooms, a pro shop, a restaurant and bar, a conference room, concessions stand and office space for Hockey Manitoba, Hockey Canada, and TNSE.  Each of the four arenas has an NHL regulation size ice surface and is sponsored by a local business.  The Subway Arena seats 1,512 spectators, while the Flynn, Assiniboine Credit Union, and MB Building Trades arenas each seat 225 spectators.

Events
hockey for all centre was one of three venues that hosted the 2011 World Under 17 Hockey Challenge, a major international hockey tournament held annually by Hockey Canada.  It was slated to host the 2012 tournament also, but Hockey Canada, at the request of TNSE, decided to relocate the tournament to Windsor, Ontario.

Some of the annual events taking place at the Iceplex include the Manitoba Senior 'A' hockey championship, the Winnipeg High School Hockey League Rookie Classic and the Hockey Manitoba Cup.

Due to provincial health orders from the COVID-19 pandemic that prohibited fan attendance, the majority of Manitoba Moose home games for the 2020-21 AHL season were moved to the Assiniboine Credit Union Arena in the Iceplex.

References

External links
 hockey for all centre

2010 establishments in Manitoba
Indoor arenas in Manitoba
Indoor ice hockey venues in Canada
Sports venues in Winnipeg
National Hockey League practice facilities
True North Sports & Entertainment
Winnipeg Jets
Sports venues completed in 2010
Assiniboia, Winnipeg